József Berta (25 October 1912 – 9 April 1981) was a Hungarian international football player. He was born in Szigetvár, and played for the club Tokodi Üveggyári SC. He participated with the Hungary national football team at the 1936 Summer Olympics in Berlin. He died in Vaison-la-Romaine, France in 1981.

References

External links

1912 births
1981 deaths
Footballers at the 1936 Summer Olympics
Olympic footballers of Hungary
Hungarian footballers
Association football defenders
Sportspeople from Baranya County